Bowyer-Holladay House, also known as the Lewis Holladay House, is a historic archaeological site located near Fincastle, Botetourt County, Virginia. The site is located in The Botetourt Center at Greenfield industrial park.  The site consists of the ruins of an Early Republic/Federal Style two-story brick house with a limestone lined cellar in a rear-centered ell configuration.  The house was part of the plantation complex commonly referred to as the "Holladay Place."  In addition to the ruins of the main house, a log structure with an early timber and modern frame addition survives 25 feet north of the bulkhead entrance to the limestone cellar.

It was listed on the National Register of Historic Places in 2010.

References

Archaeological sites on the National Register of Historic Places in Virginia
Houses in Botetourt County, Virginia
National Register of Historic Places in Botetourt County, Virginia